Edward Fisher may refer to:

 Edward Fisher (musician) (1848–1913), Canadian conductor, organist and founder of the Toronto Conservatory of Music
 Edward Fisher (engraver) (1730–1785), mezzotint engraver
 Edward Fisher (theologian) (fl. 1627–1655), English theological writer
 Edward Fisher (rower) (born 1992), English rower

See also
 Edward F. Fischer, anthropology professor
 Ed Fisher (disambiguation)
 Eduard Fischer (disambiguation)
 Edmund Fisher (disambiguation)
 Edwin Fisher (disambiguation)